The English Women's Golf Association (EWGA) was the governing body responsible for many aspects of women's and girls' amateur golf in England. It ran from 1952 to 2011, until it merged with the men's English Golf Union to form England Golf.

It was based on Highfield Road in Birmingham.

History
The EWGA (formerly ELGA) was founded in 1952 as an offshoot of the Ladies' Golf Union (LGU), the organisation which governs the female amateur game across the whole of Great Britain and Ireland.

Responsibilities
The LGU was concerned with essential policy matters and the organisation of all Britain and Ireland Championships and international events. The EWGA and its counterparts in Ireland, Scotland and Wales handled local events in their own countries, the handicapping system through their membership of the Council of National Golf Unions (CONGU) and liaison with clubs. The EWGA was also responsible for promoting golf to girls and women in England.

References

External links
Official site

 
Organisations based in the West Midlands (county)
Golf
1952 establishments in England
Women's golf in the United Kingdom
2011 disestablishments in England